Fins are distinctive anatomical features composed of bony spines or rays protruding from the body of a fish. They are covered with skin and joined together either in a webbed fashion, as seen in most bony fish, or similar to a flipper, as seen in sharks.  Apart from the tail or caudal fin, fish fins have no direct connection with the spine and are supported only by muscles. Their principal function is to help the fish swim.

Fins located in different places on the fish serve different purposes such as moving forward, turning, keeping an upright position or stopping. Most fish use fins when swimming, flying fish use pectoral fins for gliding, and frogfish use them for crawling. Fins can also be used for other purposes; male sharks and mosquitofish use a modified fin to deliver sperm, thresher sharks use their caudal fin to stun prey, reef stonefish have spines in their dorsal fins that inject venom, anglerfish use the first spine of their dorsal fin like a fishing rod to lure prey, and triggerfish avoid predators by squeezing into coral crevices and using spines in their fins to lock themselves in place.


Types of fins
Fins can either be paired or unpaired. The pectoral and pelvic fins are paired, whereas the dorsal, anal and caudal fins are unpaired and situated along the midline of the body. For every type of fin, there are a number of fish species in which this particular fin has been lost during evolution (e.g. pelvic fins in Bobasatrania, caudal fin in ocean sunfish). In some clades, additional unpaired fins were acquired during evolution (e.g. additional dorsal fins, adipose fin). In some Acanthodii ("spiny sharks"), one or more pairs of "intermediate" or "prepelvic" spines are present between the pectoral and pelvic fins, but these are not associated with fins.

Bony fishes

Bony fishes form a taxonomic group called Osteichthyes (or Euteleostomi, which includes also land vertebrates). They have skeletons made of bone mostly, and can be contrasted with cartilaginous fishes (see below), which have skeletons made mainly of cartilage (except for their teeth, fin spines, and denticles).

Bony fishes are divided into ray-finned and lobe-finned fish. Most living fish are ray-finned, an extremely diverse and abundant group consisting of over 30,000 species. It is the largest class of vertebrates in existence today, making up more than 50% of species. In the distant past, lobe-finned fish were abundant. Nowadays they are show depauperate diversity, with only eight living species.

Bony fish have fin spines and rays called lepidotrichia. They typically have swim bladders, which allows the fish to create a neutral balance between sinking and floating without having to use its fins. However, swim bladders are absent in many fish, most notably in Lungfishes, which are the only fish to have retained the primitive lung present in the common ancestor of bony fish from which swim bladders evolved. Bony fishes also have an operculum, which helps them breathe without having to use fins to swim.

Lobe-fins

Lobe-finned fishes form a class of bony fishes called Sarcopterygii. They have fleshy, lobed, paired fins, which are joined to the body by a series of bones. The fins of lobe-finned fish differ from those of all other fish in that each is borne on a fleshy, lobe-like, scaly stalk extending from the body. Pectoral and pelvic fins have articulations resembling those of tetrapod limbs. These fins evolved into legs of the first tetrapod land vertebrates (amphibians) in the Devonian Period. Sarcopterygians also possess two dorsal fins with separate bases, as opposed to the single dorsal fin of most ray-finned fish (except some teleosts). The caudal fin is either heterocercal (only fossil taxa) or diphycercal.

Latimeria is a lobe-finned fish which is still extant. There are two species, the West Indian Ocean coelacanth (Latimeria chalumnae) and the Indonesian coelacanth (Latimeria menadoensis). Coelacanths are thought to have evolved into roughly their current form about 408 million years ago, during the early Devonian.

Locomotion of the coelacanths is unique to their kind. To move around, coelacanths most commonly take advantage of up or downwellings of the current and drift. They use their paired fins to stabilize their movement through the water. While on the ocean floor their paired fins are not used for any kind of movement. Coelacanths can create thrust for quick starts by using their caudal fins. Due to the high number of fins they possess, coelacanths have high maneuverability and can orient their bodies in almost any direction in the water. They have been seen doing headstands and swimming belly up. It is thought that their rostral organ helps give the coelacanth electroperception, which aids in their movement around obstacles.

Lungfish are also living lobe-finned fish. They occur in Africa (Protopterus), Australia (Neoceratodus), and South America (Lepidosiren). Lungfish evolved during the Devonian Period. Genetic studies and paleontological data confirm that lungfish are the closest living relatives of land vertebrates.

Fin arrangement and body shape is relatively conservative in lobe-finned fishes. However, there are a few examples from the fossil record that show aberrant morphologies, such as Allenypterus, Rebellatrix, Foreyia or the tetrapodomorphs.

Diversity of fins in lobe-finned fishes

Ray-fins

Ray-finned fishes form a class of bony fishes called Actinopterygii. Their fins contain spines or rays. A fin may contain only spiny rays, only soft rays, or a combination of both. If both are present, the spiny rays are always anterior. Spines are generally stiff and sharp. Rays are generally soft, flexible, segmented, and may be branched. This segmentation of rays is the main difference that separates them from spines; spines may be flexible in certain species, but they will never be segmented.

Spines have a variety of uses. In catfish, they are used as a form of defense; many catfish have the ability to lock their spines outwards. Triggerfish also use spines to lock themselves in crevices to prevent them being pulled out.

Lepidotrichia are usually composed of bone, but in early osteichthyans such as Cheirolepis, there was also dentine and enamel. They are segmented and appear as a series of disks stacked one on top of another. They may have been derived from dermal scales. The genetic basis for the formation of the fin rays is thought to be genes coded for the production of certain proteins. It has been suggested that the evolution of the tetrapod limb from lobe-finned fishes is related to the loss of these proteins.

Diversity of fins in ray-finned fishes

Cartilaginous fishes

Cartilaginous fishes form a class of fishes called Chondrichthyes. They have skeletons made of cartilage rather than bone. The class includes sharks, rays and chimaeras.

Shark fin skeletons are elongated and supported with soft and unsegmented rays named ceratotrichia, filaments of elastic protein resembling the horny keratin in hair and feathers. Originally the pectoral and pelvic girdles, which do not contain any dermal elements, did not connect. In later forms, each pair of fins became ventrally connected in the middle when scapulocoracoid and puboischiadic bars evolved. In rays, the pectoral fins have connected to the head and are very flexible. One of the primary characteristics present in most sharks is the heterocercal tail, which aids in locomotion. Most sharks have eight fins. Sharks can only drift away from objects directly in front of them because their fins do not allow them to move in the tail-first direction.

Unlike modern cartilaginous fish, members of stem chondrichthyan lineages (e.g. the climatiids and the diplacanthids) possessed pectoral dermal plates as well as dermal spines associated with the paired fins. The oldest species demonstrating these features is the acanthodian Fanjingshania renovata from the lower Silurian (Aeronian) of China. Fanjingshania possess compound pectoral plates composed of dermal scales fused to a bony plate and fin spines formed entirely of bone. Fin spines associated with the dorsal fins are rare among extant cartilaginous fishes, but are present, for instance, in Heterodontus or Squalus. Dorsal fin spines are typically developed in many fossil groups, such as in Hybodontiformes, Ctenacanthiformes or Xenacanthida. In Stethacanthus, the first dorsal fin spine was modified, forming a spine-brush complex.

As with most fish, the tails of sharks provide thrust, making speed and acceleration dependent on tail shape. Caudal fin shapes vary considerably between shark species, due to their evolution in separate environments. Sharks possess a heterocercal caudal fin in which the dorsal portion is usually noticeably larger than the ventral portion. This is because the shark's vertebral column extends into that dorsal portion, providing a greater surface area for muscle attachment. This allows more efficient locomotion among these negatively buoyant cartilaginous fish. By contrast, most bony fish possess a homocercal caudal fin.

Tiger sharks have a large upper lobe, which allows for slow cruising and sudden bursts of speed. The tiger shark must be able to twist and turn in the water easily when hunting to support its varied diet, whereas the porbeagle shark, which hunts schooling fish such as mackerel and herring, has a large lower lobe to help it keep pace with its fast-swimming prey. Other tail adaptations help sharks catch prey more directly, such as the thresher shark's usage of its powerful, elongated upper lobe to stun fish and squid.

On the other hand, rays rely on their enlarged pectoral fins for propulsion. Similarly enlarged pectoral fins can be found in the extinct Petalodontiformes (e.g. Belantsea, Janassa, Menaspis), which belong to Holocephali (ratfish and their fossil relatives), or in Aquilolamna (Selachimorpha) and Squatinactis (Squatinactiformes). Some cartilaginous fishes have an eel-like locomotion (e.g. Chlamydoselachus, Thrinacoselache, Phoebodus)

Diversity of fins in cartilaginous fishes

Shark finning

According to the Humane Society International, approximately 100 million sharks are killed each year for their fins, in an act known as shark finning. After the fins are cut off, the mutilated sharks are thrown back in the water and left to die.

In some countries of Asia, shark fins are a culinary delicacy, such as shark fin soup. Currently, international concerns over the sustainability and welfare of sharks have impacted consumption and availability of shark fin soup worldwide. Shark finning is prohibited in many countries.

Fin functions

Generating thrust

Foil shaped fins generate thrust when moved, the lift of the fin sets water or air in motion and pushes the fin in the opposite direction. Aquatic animals get significant thrust by moving fins back and forth in water. Often the tail fin is used, but some aquatic animals generate thrust from pectoral fins.

Cavitation occurs when negative pressure causes bubbles (cavities) to form in a liquid, which then promptly and violently collapse. It can cause significant damage and wear. Cavitation damage can occur to the tail fins of powerful swimming marine animals, such as dolphins and tuna. Cavitation is more likely to occur near the surface of the ocean, where the ambient water pressure is relatively low. Even if they have the power to swim faster, dolphins may have to restrict their speed because collapsing cavitation bubbles on their tail are too painful. Cavitation also slows tuna, but for a different reason. Unlike dolphins, these fish do not feel the bubbles, because they have bony fins without nerve endings. Nevertheless, they cannot swim faster because the cavitation bubbles create a vapor film around their fins that limits their speed. Lesions have been found on tuna that are consistent with cavitation damage.

Scombrid fishes (tuna, mackerel and bonito) are particularly high-performance swimmers. Along the margin at the rear of their bodies is a line of small rayless, non-retractable fins, known as finlets. There has been much speculation about the function  of these finlets. Research done in 2000 and 2001 by Nauen and Lauder indicated that "the finlets have a hydrodynamic effect on local flow during steady swimming" and that "the most posterior finlet is oriented to redirect flow into the developing tail vortex, which may increase thrust produced by the tail of swimming mackerel".

Fish use multiple fins, so it is possible that a given fin can have a hydrodynamic interaction with another fin. In particular, the fins immediately upstream of the caudal (tail) fin may be proximate fins that can directly affect the flow dynamics at the caudal fin. In 2011, researchers using volumetric imaging techniques were able to generate "the first instantaneous three-dimensional views of wake structures as they are produced by freely swimming fishes". They found that "continuous tail beats resulted in the formation of a linked chain of vortex rings" and that "the dorsal and anal fin wakes are rapidly entrained by the caudal fin wake, approximately within the timeframe of a subsequent tail beat".

Controlling motion
Once motion has been established, the motion itself can be controlled with the use of other fins.

The bodies of reef fishes are often shaped differently from open water fishes. Open water fishes are usually built for speed, streamlined like torpedoes to minimise friction as they move through the water. Reef fish operate in the relatively confined spaces and complex underwater landscapes of coral reefs. For this manoeuvrability is more important than straight line speed, so coral reef fish have developed bodies which optimize their ability to dart and change direction. They outwit predators by dodging into fissures in the reef or playing hide and seek around coral heads. The pectoral and pelvic fins of many reef fish, such as butterflyfish, damselfish and angelfish, have evolved so they can act as brakes and allow complex manoeuvres. Many reef fish, such as butterflyfish, damselfish and angelfish, have evolved bodies which are deep and laterally compressed like a pancake, and will fit into fissures in rocks. Their pelvic and pectoral fins have evolved differently, so they act together with the flattened body to optimise manoeuvrability. Some fishes, such as puffer fish, filefish and trunkfish, rely on pectoral fins for swimming and hardly use tail fins at all.

Reproduction

Male cartilaginous fishes (sharks and rays), as well as the males of some live-bearing ray finned fishes, have fins that have been modified to function as intromittent organs, reproductive appendages which allow internal fertilization. In ray finned fish they are called gonopodia or andropodia, and in cartilaginous fish they are called claspers.

Gonopodia are found on the males of some species in the Anablepidae and Poeciliidae families. They are anal fins that have been modified to function as movable intromittent organs and are used to impregnate females with milt during mating.  The third, fourth and fifth rays of the male's anal fin are formed into a tube-like structure in which the sperm of the fish is ejected. When ready for mating, the gonopodium becomes erect and points forward towards the female. The male shortly inserts the organ into the sex opening of the female, with hook-like adaptations that allow the fish to grip onto the female to ensure impregnation. If a female remains stationary and her partner contacts her vent with his gonopodium, she is fertilized. The sperm is preserved in the female's oviduct. This allows females to fertilize themselves at any time without further assistance from males. In some species, the gonopodium may be half the total body length. Occasionally the fin is too long to be used, as in the "lyretail" breeds of Xiphophorus helleri. Hormone treated females may develop gonopodia. These are useless for breeding.

Similar organs with similar characteristics are found in other fishes, for example the andropodium in the Hemirhamphodon or in the Goodeidae or the gonopodium in the Middle Triassic Saurichthys, the oldest known example of viviparity in a ray-finned fish.

Claspers are found on the males of cartilaginous fishes. They are the posterior part of the pelvic fins that have also been modified to function as intromittent organs, and are used to channel semen into the female's cloaca during copulation. The act of mating in sharks usually includes raising one of the claspers to allow water into a siphon through a specific orifice.  The clasper is then inserted into the cloaca, where it opens like an umbrella to anchor its position. The siphon then begins to contract expelling water and sperm.

Other functions
Other uses of fins include walking and perching on the sea floor, gliding over water, cooling of body temperature, stunning of prey, display (scaring of predators, courtship), defence (venomous fin spines, locking between corals), luring of prey, and attachment structures.

The Indo-Pacific sailfish has a prominent dorsal fin. Like scombroids and other billfish, they streamline themselves by retracting their dorsal fins into a groove in their body when they swim. The huge dorsal fin, or sail, of the sailfish is kept retracted most of the time. Sailfish raise them if they want to herd a school of small fish, and also after periods of high activity, presumably to cool down.

The oriental flying gurnard has large pectoral fins which it normally holds against its body, and expands when threatened to scare predators. Despite its name, it is a demersal fish, not a flying fish, and uses its pelvic fins to walk along the bottom of the ocean.

Fins can have an adaptive significance as sexual ornaments. During courtship, the female cichlid, Pelvicachromis taeniatus, displays a large and visually arresting purple pelvic fin. "The researchers found that males clearly preferred females with a larger pelvic fin and that pelvic fins grew in a more disproportionate way than other fins on female fish."

Evolution

Evolution of paired fins 

There are two prevailing hypotheses that have been historically debated as models for the evolution of paired fins in fish: the gill arch theory and the lateral fin-fold theory. The former, commonly referred to as the “Gegenbaur hypothesis,” was posited in 1870 and proposes that the “paired fins are derived from gill structures”. This fell out of popularity in favor of the lateral fin-fold theory, first suggested in 1877, which proposes that paired fins budded from longitudinal, lateral folds along the epidermis just behind the gills. There is weak support for both hypotheses in the fossil record and in embryology. However, recent insights from developmental patterning have prompted reconsideration of both theories in order to better elucidate the origins of paired fins.

Classical theories 
Karl Gegenbaur's concept of the “Archipterygium” was introduced in 1876. It was described as a gill ray, or “joined cartilaginous stem,” that extended from the gill arch. Additional rays arose from along the arch and from the central gill ray. Gegenbaur suggested a model of transformative homology – that all vertebrate paired fins and limbs were transformations of the Archipterygium. Based on this theory, paired appendages such as pectoral and pelvic fins would have differentiated from the branchial arches and migrated posteriorly. However, there has been limited support for this hypothesis in the fossil record both morphologically and phylogenically. In addition, there was little to no evidence of an anterior-posterior migration of pelvic fins. Such shortcomings of the gill-arch theory led to its early demise in favor of the lateral fin-fold theory proposed by St. George Jackson Mivart, Francis Balfour, and James Kingsley Thacher.

The lateral fin-fold theory hypothesized that paired fins developed from lateral folds along the body wall of the fish. Just as segmentation and budding of the median fin fold gave rise to the median fins, a similar mechanism of fin bud segmentation and elongation from a lateral fin fold was proposed to have given rise to the paired pectoral and pelvic fins. However, there was little evidence of a lateral fold-to-fin transition in the fossil record. In addition, it was later demonstrated phylogenically that pectoral and pelvic fins arise from distinct evolutionary and mechanistic origins.

Evolutionary developmental biology 
Recent studies in the ontogeny and evolution of paired appendages have compared finless vertebrates – such as lampreys – with chondricthyes, the most basal living vertebrate with paired fins. In 2006, researchers found that the same genetic programming involved in the segmentation and development of median fins was found in the development of paired appendages in catsharks.  Although these findings do not directly support the lateral fin-fold hypothesis, the original concept of a shared median-paired fin evolutionary developmental mechanism remains relevant.

A similar renovation of an old theory may be found in the developmental programming of chondricthyan gill arches and paired appendages. In 2009, researchers at the University of Chicago demonstrated that there are shared molecular patterning mechanisms in the early development of the chondricthyan gill arch and paired fins. Findings such as these have prompted reconsideration of the once-debunked gill-arch theory.

From fins to limbs 

Fish are the ancestors of all mammals, reptiles, birds and amphibians. In particular, terrestrial tetrapods (four-legged animals) evolved from fish and made their first forays onto land 400 million years ago. They used paired pectoral and pelvic fins for locomotion. The pectoral fins developed into forelegs (arms in the case of humans) and the pelvic fins developed into hind legs. Much of the genetic machinery that builds a walking limb in a tetrapod is already present in the swimming fin of a fish.

In 2011, researchers at Monash University in Australia used primitive but still living lungfish "to trace the evolution of pelvic fin muscles to find out how the load-bearing hind limbs of the tetrapods evolved." Further research at the University of Chicago found bottom-walking lungfishes had already evolved characteristics of the walking gaits of terrestrial tetrapods.

In a classic example of convergent evolution, the pectoral limbs of pterosaurs, birds and bats further evolved along independent paths into flying wings. Even with flying wings there are many similarities with walking legs, and core aspects of the genetic blueprint of the pectoral fin have been retained.

The first mammals appeared during the Permian period (between 298.9 and 252.17 million years ago). Several groups of these mammals started returning to the sea, including the cetaceans (whales, dolphins and porpoises). Recent DNA analysis suggests that cetaceans evolved from within the even-toed ungulates, and that they share  a common ancestor with the hippopotamus.  About 23 million years ago another group of bearlike land mammals started returning to the sea. These were the seals. What had become walking limbs in  cetaceans and seals evolved independently into new forms of swimming fins. The forelimbs became flippers, while the hindlimbs were either lost (cetaceans) or also modified into flipper (pinnipeds). In cetaceans, the tail gained  two fins at the end, called a fluke. Fish tails are usually vertical and move from side to side. Cetacean flukes are horizontal and move up and down, because cetacean spines bend the same way as in other mammals.

Ichthyosaurs are ancient reptiles that resembled dolphins. They first appeared about 245 million years ago and disappeared about 90 million years ago.
"This sea-going reptile with terrestrial ancestors converged so strongly on fishes that it actually evolved a dorsal fin and tail fin for improved aquatic locomotion. These structures are all the more remarkable because they evolved from nothing — the ancestral terrestrial reptile had no hump on its back or blade on its tail to serve as a precursor."
The biologist Stephen Jay Gould said the ichthyosaur was his favorite example of convergent evolution.

Fins or flippers of varying forms and at varying locations (limbs, body, tail) have also evolved in a number of other tetrapod groups, including diving birds such as penguins (modified from wings), sea turtles (forelimbs modified into flippers), mosasaurs (limbs modified into flippers), and sea snakes (vertically expanded, flattened tail fin).

Robotic fins

The use of fins for the propulsion of aquatic animals can be remarkably effective. It has been calculated that some fish can achieve a propulsive efficiency greater than 90%. Fish can accelerate and maneuver much more effectively than boats or submarine, and produce less water disturbance and noise. This has led to biomimetic studies of underwater robots which attempt to emulate the locomotion of aquatic animals. An example is the Robot Tuna built by the Institute of Field Robotics, to analyze and mathematically model thunniform motion. In 2005, the Sea Life London Aquarium displayed three robotic fish created by the computer science department at the University of Essex. The fish were designed to be autonomous, swimming around and avoiding obstacles like real fish. Their creator claimed that he was trying to combine "the speed of tuna, acceleration of a pike, and the navigating skills of an eel."

The AquaPenguin, developed by Festo of Germany, copies the streamlined shape and propulsion by front flippers of penguins. Festo also developed AquaRay, AquaJelly and AiraCuda, respectively emulating the locomotion of manta rays, jellyfish and barracuda.

In 2004, Hugh Herr at MIT prototyped a biomechatronic robotic fish with a living actuator by surgically transplanting muscles from frog legs to the robot and then making the robot swim by pulsing the muscle fibers with electricity.

Robotic fish offer some research advantages, such as the ability to examine an individual part of a fish design in isolation from the rest of the fish. However, this risks oversimplifying the biology so key aspects of the animal design are overlooked. Robotic fish also allow researchers to vary a single parameter, such as flexibility or  a specific motion control. Researchers can directly measure forces, which is not easy to do in live fish. "Robotic devices also facilitate three-dimensional kinematic studies and correlated hydrodynamic analyses, as the location of the locomotor surface can be known accurately. And, individual components of a natural motion (such as outstroke vs. instroke of a flapping appendage) can be programmed separately, which is certainly difficult to achieve when working with a live animal."

See also
 Cephalopod fin
 Fin and flipper locomotion
 Fish locomotion
 Polydactyly in early tetrapods
 RoboTuna
 Shark fin soup
 Tradeoffs for locomotion in air and water
 Undulatory locomotion

References

Citations

Bibliography

Further reading
 Hall, Brian K (2007) Fins into Limbs: Evolution, Development, and Transformation University of Chicago Press. .
 Helfman G, Collette BB, Facey DE and Bowen BW (2009) "Functional morphology of locomotion and feeding" Chapter 8, pp. 101–116. In:The Diversity of Fishes: Biology, John Wiley & Sons. .

External links
 Homology of fin lepidotrichia in osteichthyan fishes
 The Fish's Fin Earthlife Web
 Can robot fish find pollution? HowStuffWorks. Accessed 30 January 2012.

Fish anatomy